

The Colani Cormoran CCE208 was a five-seat light aircraft under development in Germany in the late 1980s. The highly streamlined and unusual design was the work of the aeronautical engineer Walter Schulze with the collaboration of the celebrated industrial designer Luigi Colani. A particularly unorthodox feature was the pusher propeller mounted behind the top of the T-tail.  Power was to be supplied by a converted Porsche automobile engine rated at 245 horsepower.  The airframe was to be largely composite construction. A mockup was displayed at the Paris Air Show in 1987.

Construction of the prototype aircraft was to have been undertaken by the Composite Engineering Company in Germany, with financial backing from Tohshin of Japan.

Specifications (as designed)

References

 
 
 

Abandoned civil aircraft projects
Mid-engined aircraft
Mid-wing aircraft
Single-engined pusher aircraft
Composite Engineering aircraft